Montego may refer to:

Places
 Montego Bay, Saint James, Jamaica, a city and the capital of Saint James

Automobiles
 Austin Montego, a 1984–1995 British compact car, also sold by MG, Rover, and Sipani
 Mercury Montego, a 1968–1976, 2004–2007 American full-size car

People
 Montego Glover (born 1974), American stage actress and singer
 Montego Joe (1929–2010), American jazz percussionist and drummer

See also
 Mondego (disambiguation)
 Montego Bay (disambiguation)